Rich and Famous is a 1987 Hong Kong action-crime film directed by Taylor Wong, and starring Chow Yun-fat, Andy Lau, Alan Tam, and Alex Man. The film was concluded by a sequel, Tragic Hero which was also released in 1987.

Plot

Rich & Famous tells the story of two boys who are not related but grew up as brothers, Kwok (Andy Lau) and Yung (Alex Man). While Yung is the elder, he is always getting into trouble which Kwok has to help bail him out of.

One day, in 1967, Yung's gambling goes too far and he loses a bet he cannot afford to lose.  Kwok and Yung get into a massive fight with the local gang running the gambling hall.  The boss threatens to cut Yung's pinky off.  Fortunately Kwok tells a touching tale about how their father is ill and that is why they are gambling to support him.

The pair hatch a plan with their nervous cousin Mak Ying Hung (Alan Tam), who has gang connections, to rob some goods from a gang boss, Chu Lo-Tai (Ko Chun-hsiung).  They succeed at stealing the suitcase and attempt to buy plane tickets to America to avoid paying off the debts.  They are interrupted at the travel office and Kwok is taken away to be tortured.  The sister of Yung, Wai Chui (Pauline Wong) works at a tea house that a powerful gangster named Li Ah Chai (Chow Yun-fat) frequents.  She comes in to serve him and is rudely bitten by Li Ah Chai's friend Fan.  It reveals a wound that was sustained when Kwok was captured.  She and Yung explain their situation and despite advice against helping them, Li Ah Chai decides to bail them out by threatening the gangsters with force.  Chu Lo-Tai releases Kwok but not before burning his tongue with his cigar and pouring hot coffee down his throat.

Kwok thanks Li Ah Chai and then passes out from happiness when Ah Chai offers him and Yung a job as gangsters.

Mak Ying Hung asks Kwok and Yung to introduce him to Li Ah Chai so that he may become a gangster as well.  Mak stutters uncontrollably and sneezes in Ah Chai's face.  He makes a poor impression and Ah Chai ignores him.  Kwok gives Mak a chance so he and Mak go to collect money where Mak is unable to extract the money from the local business.  He is thoroughly embarrassed and Ah Chai tells Mak that he is not cut out to be a gangster.  Mak walks up the street, which brings a close to act 1.

Fast forward to 1971, Kwok and Yung have advanced in Ah Chai's gang and their sister Wai Chui is now Li Ah Chai's housekeeper.  They arrange to do a business deal with a gangster.  The gangster double crosses them, leading to Kwok being seriously injured.  Yung is reprimanded for being selfish and attention seeking for not staying in the van to keep an eye out for any suspicious behavior.  This clearly shows the tension starting to rise between Yung and Ah Chai.

In attempt to gain favor, Yung introduces Ah Chai to his love interest, Mak's cousin, Lau Po-Yee (Carina Lau).  Ah Chai is distracted and is contacted in regards to an interruption in the drug trade.

Ah Chai has been hiding his friend Fan, who has become gravely ill.  Fan apparently has crossed the Thailand drug lords and has now stopped any drug shipments to Hong Kong.  This draws the ire of the other gangs who demand that Ah Chai kill or turn in Fan.  They tell him that the drug trade means a lot to them but maybe not so much to Ah Chai since he is not involved in the drug trade for profit.  It is at this point that Yung suddenly speaks up and acknowledges that the drug trade is important, contrary to Ah Chai's response.  Ah Chai's rival, Chu Lo-Tai notices Yung's impulsiveness.

Ah Chai explains that he owes Fan a personal debt because Fan had saved his father.  To turn him in would mean dishonor.  Ah Chai declines.  In the car, on the way back, Ah Chai chastises Yung for speaking up, claiming that it showed the lack of cohesiveness within their gang.  He banishes Yung to a local bar.

Meanwhile, Kwok visits Mak to see how he is doing.  Mak has lost his stutter, has a nice place and now looks handsome.  Mak again asks for Kwok to get him into the gang.  Kwok hesitates and then they are rudely interrupted by Yung.  Yung talks to Kwok in private and asks where he would stand in the event that there is a split between him and Ah Chai.  Kwok doesn't openly choose sides and Yung gives him a hug.

Inspector Cheung (Danny Lee) visits Ah Chai at a restaurant and tells Ah Chai that he is going to put him in jail.  Ah Chai is not fazed by the inspector's threat.  Ah Chai attempts to buy off Inspector Cheung but he won't take it.  Ah Chai realizes he must be dealt with before he causes him trouble in the future.

Yung then meets secretly with Chu Lo-Tai and is paid to kill Fan.  Yung shows up at Fan's location and kills him and the guard.  Yung then is called to Ah Chai's office.  Ah Chai says that he knows that Yung killed Fan and asks his henchman, Number 6 (Shing Fui-On) to kill Yung.  Kwok barges into the room and begs for Yung's life.  Ah Chai takes the gun and shoots Yung in the hand.  He tells them both to get lost.

Li Ah Chai converses with Wai Chui and asks her if she wants to leave now that he's had a falling out with her brothers.  She wants to stay and tells Ah Chai that she will do anything for him and is about to admit her crush on Ah Chai when Po Yee suddenly appears, offering cake.  Ah Chai warms to her and ignores Wai Chui.  Wai Chui tries to walk with tears in her eyes.  Li Ah Chai spends more time with Po Yee and they become engaged.

The scene then switches back to Yung and Kwok.  They both go to Chu Lo-Tai to talk to him.  Kwok and Yung have a falling out over Yung's behavior and he leaves him, saying that they are no longer brothers.  As Kwok tries to leave, Chu Lo-Tai attempts to kill him using gasoline and guns.  Kwok gets away to Mak's apartment and hides out there briefly.  Yung arrives and questions Mak as to where Kwok is.  Mak refuses to tell him and Yung chops off Mak's pinky.  Mak stares defiantly back at Yung.

Li Ah Chai meets with Kwok and Mak after Yung's attack and they become friends again.  Ah Chai invites them to the wedding.  Meanwhile, Yung plots to kill Ah Chai at the wedding.

The wedding occurs and Yung's men ambushes Ah Chai on the steps.  They manage to shoot Po Yee.  Ah Chai and Po Yee attempt to escape while being chased by Yung.  Mak runs Yung down and beats him with a fender.  He is shot in the chest by Yung.  The last assassin has Po Yee hostage and stabs her in the side.  Mak distracts the assassin long enough for Ah Chai to kill him.  Ah Chai has Yung at gunpoint until suddenly his father and Wai Chui appear, begging for his life.  Yung runs and is caught by police.  Ah Chai thanks Mak for all he has done as he passes away.

In the epilogue, it indicates that Kwok quits the underworld and leaves for Malacca.  Yung is sentenced to 6 years of jail.  Ah Chai attempts to shift away from the world of violence to appease his new wife.  Chu Lo-Tai leaves the country to avoid revenge from Ah Chai.  Inspector Cheung is banished to border patrol for 3 years.

Cast
 Chow Yun-fat as Lee Ah-chai
 Andy Lau as Lam Ting-kwok
 Alan Tam as Mak Ying-hung
 Alex Man as Tang Kar-yung
 Pauline Wong as Tang Wai-chiu
 Carina Lau as Lau Po-yee
 Danny Lee as Inspector Cheung
 Ko Chun-hsiung as Chu Lo-tai
 Shing Fui-On as Number 6

References

External links
 
 
 
 

1987 films
1987 action thriller films
1980s crime thriller films
Hong Kong action thriller films
Hong Kong crime thriller films
Triad films
Gun fu films
1980s Cantonese-language films
Films set in Hong Kong
Films shot in Hong Kong
Films directed by Taylor Wong
1980s Hong Kong films